, better known by the stage name , is a Japanese comedian, TV personality, singer-songwriter, and essayist. Born in Tokorozawa, Saitama, he attended Takushoku University's Commercial Science class.

Works

Film
Shimoochiai Yakitori Movie (1979) - Eiji Yaguruma
Madadayo (1993) - Amaki
Ponyo (2008) - Fujimoto (voice)

Video games

Tokoro-san no Mamoru mo Semeru mo (Epic Sony, Family Computer)
Tokoro-san no Mah Mahjong! (1992, Arcade game, Sega, Sega System 24)
Tokoro-san no Mah Mahjong 2: Tokoro's Cup (1994, Sega, Arcade game, Sega System 24)
Tokoro's Mahjong (1994, Vic Tokai, Super Famicom)
Tokoro's Mahjong Jr. (1994, Vic Tokai, Game Boy)
Tokoro-san no Daifugou (2000, Konami, PlayStation)
Tokoro-San no Setagaya Country Club (2000, Natsume, Game Boy Color)
Jagainu-kun (2000, Victor, Game Boy Color - Composer)

Japanese dub

Live-action
ALF - ALF
Look Who's Talking - Mikey
Look Who's Talking Too - Michael "Mikey" Jensen-Ubriacco

Animation
Howard the Duck (Fuji TV edition) - Howard the Duck
Ralph Breaks the Internet - Buzz Lightyear
The Simpsons Movie - Homer Simpson
Toy Story - Buzz Lightyear
Toy Story 2 - Buzz Lightyear
Toy Story 3 - Buzz Lightyear
Toy Story 4 - Buzz Lightyear

References

External links
  - archived  
  
 
 
 

1955 births
Japanese comedians
Japanese male singer-songwriters
Japanese singer-songwriters
Japanese male voice actors
Living people
People from Saitama Prefecture
Japanese radio personalities
Japanese television personalities
Japanese television presenters
Masters of ceremonies
Avex Group artists
Musicians from Saitama Prefecture
People from Tokorozawa, Saitama